Kachumber, or cachumber, is a salad dish in Indian cuisine consisting of fresh chopped tomatoes, cucumbers, onions, lemon juice, and sometimes, chili peppers. It is similar to many other Mediterranean and Middle Eastern salads consisting of the same ingredients. Sometimes, raita, a similar dish made with curd, is also called kachumber.

See also
 Pico de gallo
 Kachumbari 
 Raita
 Çoban salatası
 Israeli salad
 Shirazi salad

References

Indian cuisine
Salads